Blanka Szávay (Hungarian: Szávay Blanka; born 24 October 1993) is a Hungarian tennis player. She is the younger sister of professional tennis player Ágnes Szávay. Szávay has won one ITF tournament in doubles, and has made her first WTA Tour appearance at the 2009 GDF Suez Grand Prix, playing doubles partnering with her sister.

Early life 
Szávay was born to Terezia Szávay (née Dasko), a coach and a  teacher, and Zsolt Szávay. She has two siblings, a sister Ágnes, who is a professional tennis player, and a brother Levente. Blanka Szávay is fluent in Hungarian and English.

Career 
Szávay began playing at the junior circuit in 2007. Since then, she has won one singles and two doubles tournaments, with No. 142 as her highest combinated ranking so far. Szávay made her professional debut in 2009, at the WTA Tour event 2009 GDF Suez Grand Prix in Budapest. She played qualifications for the singles draw, but lost in the second round to Timea Bacsinszky 6–0, 6–1. Partnering with her sister Ágnes, she played in the doubles main draw, but they lost to Mariya Koryttseva and Ioana Raluca Olaru 6–1, 6–3 in the first round. In 2010, Szávay won her first professional title, in doubles, at Durban, South Africa. She also played qualifications for 2010 GDF Suez Grand Prix, but lost in the first round.

Career statistics

ITF doubles finals (1–0)

References

External links 
 
 

1993 births
Hungarian female tennis players
Living people
People from Kiskunhalas
Sportspeople from Bács-Kiskun County
21st-century Hungarian women